Elton "Sam" Langford (May 21, 1900 – July 31, 1993) was a Major League Baseball center fielder who played three seasons of professional baseball for the Boston Red Sox and the Cleveland Indians.

References

External links

1900 births
1993 deaths
Major League Baseball outfielders
Cleveland Indians players
Boston Red Sox players
Baseball players from Texas